The Dampf-Bahn-Club Sprockhövel operates since 2004 passenger transport on their ridable miniature railway with 127 mm (5 inches) and 184 mm (7¼ inches) gauge in Sprockhövel-Haßlinghausen in North Rhine Westphalia, Germany.

Location 
The rail track is located in the immediate vicinity of the former railway line Schee-Silschede, which is now used as a bicycle trail and is part of the Von-Ruhr-zur-Ruhr-Radweg.

Route 
The tracks are laid on a concrete foundation with a camber in the bends.

This is a complex construction, which is rare in garden railways, as the tracks are usually laid as in the raw-model in a ballast bed. With financial support from a local foundation, the association succeeded in 2017 to build a steel bridge, which is also used as a track underpass.

The club regularly organizes public driving days between April and September, which attracts mainly local families for leisure activities.

Rolling stock 
Most of the locomotive models are privately owned. These are driven by real steam or by electric motors that obtain their energy from accumulators . 
The scales of the vehicles vary between 1: 8 and 1: 3. Some locomotives were built in-house.

References

External links 
 
 

Miniature railways in Germany
Ennepe-Ruhr-Kreis